The Baroque Revival, also known as Neo-Baroque (or Second Empire architecture in France and Wilhelminism in Germany), was an architectural style of the late 19th century. The term is used to describe architecture and architectural sculptures which display important aspects of Baroque style, but are not of the original Baroque period. Elements of the Baroque architectural tradition were an essential part of the curriculum of the École des Beaux-Arts in Paris, the pre-eminent school of architecture in the second half of the 19th century, and are integral to the Beaux-Arts architecture it engendered both in France and abroad. 
An ebullient sense of European imperialism encouraged an official architecture to reflect it in Britain and France, and in Germany and Italy the Baroque Revival expressed pride in the new power of the unified state.

Notable examples

 Akasaka Palace (1899–1909), Tokyo, Japan
 Alferaki Palace (1848), Taganrog, Russia
 Ashton Memorial (1907–1909), Lancaster, England
 Belfast City Hall (1898–1906), Belfast, Northern Ireland
 Beloselsky-Belozersky Palace (1747), Saint Petersburg, Russia
 Bode Museum (1904), Berlin, Germany
 British Columbia Parliament Buildings (1893–1897), Victoria, British Columbia, Canada
 Burgtheater (1888), Vienna, Austria
 Cardiff City Hall (1897-1906), Cardiff, Wales
 Christiansborg Palace (1907–1928), Copenhagen, Denmark
 Cluj-Napoca National Theatre (1904–1906), Cluj-Napoca, Romania
 Ortaköy Mosque (1854–6), Istanbul, Turkey
 Dolmabahçe Palace (1843–1856), Istanbul, Turkey
 The Elms Mansion (1899–1901), Newport, Rhode Island, United States
 Näsilinna (also known as the Milavida Palace) (1898), Tampere, Finland
 National Theatre (1899), Oslo, Norway
 Palais Garnier (also known as the Paris Opera) (1861–1875), Paris, France
 Port of Liverpool Building (1903–07) Liverpool, England
 Rosecliff Mansion (1898–1902), Newport, Rhode Island, United States
 Royal Museum for Central Africa (1905–1909), Tervuren, Belgium
 Semperoper (1878), Dresden, Germany
 Sofia University rectorate (1924–1934), Sofia, Bulgaria
 Zachęta National Gallery of Art (1898–1900), Warsaw, Poland
 St. Barbara's Church (1910), Brooklyn, New York, United States
 St. John Cantius Church (1893–1898), Chicago, United States
 Church of St. Ignatius Loyola (1895–1900), New York City, United States
 Church of Saints Peter and Paul (1932–39), Athlone, Ireland
 Cathedral of Salta (1882), Salta, Argentina
 Széchenyi thermal bath (1913), Budapest, Hungary
 Volkstheater (1889), Vienna, Austria
 National Art Gallery of Bulgaria (the former royal palace), Sofia, Bulgaria
 Wenckheim Palace (1886–1889), Budapest, Hungary
 Stefánia Palace (formerly named Park Club) (1893–1895), Budapest, Hungary
 Gran Teatro de La Habana (1908–1915), Havana, Cuba
 Old Parliament Building (1930), Colombo, Sri Lanka
 House of the National Assembly of Serbia (1907–1936), Belgrade, Serbia.
 Durban City Hall, South Africa
 Oceanographic Museum of Monaco, Principality of Monaco

There are also number of post-modern buildings with a style that might be called "Baroque", for example the Dancing House in Prague by Vlado Milunić and Frank Gehry, who have described it as "new Baroque".

Baroque Revival architects

 Ferdinand Fellner (1847–1916) and Hermann Helmer (1849–1919)
 Arthur Meinig (1853–1904)
 Sir Edwin Lutyens (1869–1944)
 Members of the Armenian Balyan family (19th Century)
 Charles Garnier (1825–1898)

Gallery

See also
List of Baroque architecture
List of Baroque residences
Second Empire architecture
Edwardian Baroque architecture
Wilhelminism

References

Further reading

James Stevens Curl; "Neo-Baroque." A Dictionary of Architecture and Landscape Architecture; Oxford University Press. 2000. — Encyclopedia.com . accessed 3 Jan. 2010.

 
Architectural styles
Revival architectural styles
Architecture
Baroque architecture
19th-century architectural styles
20th-century architectural styles